Nasirdin may refer to:

Nasirdin Isanov, Kyrgyzstani prime minister
Naser ol Din, a village in Iran
Nasirdin (Yazidi saint)